Championship Motocross Featuring Ricky Carmichael is a video game developed by Funcom Dublin and published by THQ for the PlayStation in 1999. It is the first of four motocross racing games published by THQ to be endorsed by professional motocross racer Ricky Carmichael. A sequel, Championship Motocross 2001 Featuring Ricky Carmichael, was released for Game Boy Color in 2000, and for PlayStation in 2001.

Development
The game was showcased at E3 1999.

Reception

The game received favorable reviews according to the review aggregation website GameRankings. Jeff Lundrigan of NextGen said, "The high level of difficulty will frustrate many, but man, whatta ride." In Japan, where the game was ported and published by MediaWorks under the name  on January 6, 2000, Famitsu gave it a score of 27 out of 40.

Legacy
THQ's partnership with Carmichael would endure for several more years, resulting in three more motocross racing games that received endorsement from Carmichael: a sequel to the game, titled Championship Motocross 2001 Featuring Ricky Carmichael, followed by what would be the first two installments of the Championship Motocross duology's follow-up series, the MX trilogy: MX 2002 featuring Ricky Carmichael and MX Superfly featuring Ricky Carmichael. This new trilogy, released on sixth-generation platforms, would be a precursor to THQ's racing series, MX vs. ATV, a crossover with Sony's ATV Offroad Fury series.

Notes

References

External links
 

1999 video games
MediaWorks games
Motorcycle video games
PlayStation (console) games
PlayStation (console)-only games
Racing video games
THQ games
Video games based on real people
Video games developed in Ireland